Solicitors Journal is a legal periodical published in the United Kingdom. 

It was established in 1856. It was published weekly until September 2017, when it ceased publication, and has been published monthly since January 2019, when it resumed publication.

Publishers
The original publisher of the Solicitors Journal was the Law Newspaper Company Limited.

The Solicitors Journal was formerly published by Longman Group UK Ltd. Longman Law, Tax and Finance then became FT Law & Tax, a subsidiary of Financial Times Professional Ltd and part of Pearson Professional Limited, and the Solicitors Journal was published by FT Law & Tax. FT Law & Tax became part of the Sweet & Maxwell Group in 1998. The Solictors Journal was bought from Sweet & Maxwell in November 2002 or in 2003 by Wilmington plc who published it until September 2017. It has been published by International In-house Counsel Journal Limited a company with a registered office in Cambridge and a principal trading address in King's Lynn, since January 2019.

The magazine formerly had its headquarters in London.

Editors
Editors included William Shaen, Alexander Edward Miller, William Mitchell Fawcett (from 1872 to 1912), John Mason Lightwood (from 1912 to 1925), David Hughes Parry (from 1925 to 1928), John Robert Perceval-Maxwell (from 1928 to 1929), Thomas Cunliffe (from 1929 to 1948), John Passmore Widgery (from 1948 to 1955), Philip Asterley Jones (from 1956 to 1968), Neville David Vandyk (from 1 April 1968 to 1988), Julian Harris and Marie Staunton (from 1990 to 1997)

Law reports and citation
The Solicitors Journal publishes law reports. For the purposes of citation, its name may be abbreviated to "SJ" or "Sol Jo", while "Solicitors' Journal and Reporter" may be abbreviated to "Sol J & R".

History
The Solicitors Journal replaced the Legal Observer and Solicitors Journal, also known as the Legal Observer (1830–1856). The Weekly Reporter (1853–1906) merged into the Solicitors Journal. The Weekly Reporter's common law editor from 1862 to 1866 was Standish Grove Grady.

References

Further reading
Solicitors Journal and Reporter. WorldCat.
Solicitors Journal and Weekly Reporter. WorldCat.
Steve Wilson and Phillip Kenny. The Law Student's Handbook. Oxford University Press. 2010. . p 125
Solicitors Journal to close after 160 years. The Journal of the Law Society of Scotland. 18 September 2017.
A sad farewell to Solicitors' Journal. Incorporated Council of Law Reporting. 26 September 2017.
Solicitors Journal goes under after 160 years. The Brief. The Times. 19 September 2017.
So farewell then, SJ, The Law Society Gazette, 15 September 2017
"Centenary of The Solicitors' Journal" (1957) 107 The Law Journal 76 
Laurel Brake and Marysa Demoor. Dictionary of Nineteenth-Century Journalism in Great Britain and Ireland. Academia Press and British Library. 2009. Page 585. See also "Professional Journals" at pages 509 and 510.
(1964) 3 The Solicitor Quarterly 115 (April) Google Books
Owen Hood Phillips. A First Book of English Law. Sweet & Maxwell. Fourth Edition. 1960. Page 169.
Glanville Williams. Learning the Law. Eleventh Edition. Stevens. 1982. Page 47.
Winfield, Percy H. The Chief Sources of English Legal History. Harvard University Press. 1925. Reprinted by Beard Books. 2000. Page 193.
Michael Harwood. Conveyancing Law & Practice. Second Edition. Cavendish Publishing Limited. 1996. Page 528.

External links 
 

Weekly magazines published in the United Kingdom
English-language magazines
Legal magazines
Magazines published in London
Magazines established in 1856